AppScale is a software company offering cloud infrastructure software and services to enterprises, government agencies, contractors, and third-party service providers. The company commercially supports one software product, AppScale ATS, a managed hybrid cloud infrastructure software platform that emulates the core AWS APIs. In 2019, the company ended commercial support for its open-source serverless computing platform AppScale GTS, however, its source code remains freely available to the open-source community.

History
AppScale began as a research project at the University of California, Santa Barbara Computer Science Department under the supervision of Professor Chandra Krintz. The project was originally funded by the NSF, with additional funding from Google, IBM and NIH. In 2012, co-founders Dr. Chandra Krintz, Chief Scientist, Dr. Navraj Chohan, Development Lead, and Woody Rollins, CEO founded AppScale Systems to commercialize the private PaaS AppScale technology. Rollins, a pioneer in private cloud infrastructure, was a co-founder and former CEO of Eucalyptus Systems. In 2014, Graziano Obertelli joined AppScale as VP of Operations from Eucalyptus Systems, where he was a co-founder. In 2017, Dimitrii Calzago joined AppScale as CTO from Hewlett Packard Enterprise, where he was Director of Cloud R&D.

In April 2014, AppScale Systems was named a 2014 Cool Vendor in PaaS by Gartner, Inc. In September 2014, AppScale Systems won a Bossie Award from InfoWorld for best open source data center and cloud software. AppScale partnered with Optimal Dynamics on April 11, 2016. AppScale was part of the AliLaunch Program, August 9, 2016. Chandra Kritz, Chief Science Officer of AppScale, was featured on Dev Radio in the episode titled "How to Rescue your apps with the help of AppScale" on December 16, 2016.

In late 2017, AppScale Systems started offering commercial support for Eucalyptus private cloud software after DXC Technology chose to stop the development and support of Eucalyptus. This prompted  AppScale, led by members of the Eucalyptus founding team, to fork the code and continue developing the software, which was renamed AppScale ATS.

AppScale ATS 
AppScale ATS (formerly Eucalyptus) is a managed hybrid cloud infrastructure software that emulates the core AWS APIs. AppScale ATS implements AWS-compatible cloud services over dedicated infrastructure, providing a dedicated private AWS region. ATS enables the creation of cost-effective and flexible AWS hybrid cloud environments with a seamless experience for developers and workloads across public and private resources. No special-purpose hardware or unorthodox operating system configurations are required and the entire software stack utilizes open-sourced components. The software is primarily used by enterprises and government agencies to place data and compute in specific geographies (for compliance) or close to data sources (for latency).

AppScale GTS 

AppScale GTS is an open-source serverless computing platform that automatically deploys and scales unmodified Google App Engine applications over public and private clouds, as well as on-premises clusters. AppScale is modeled on the App Engine APIs and has support for Go, Java, PHP, and Python applications.

The goal of AppScale is to provide developers with a rapid, API-driven development platform that can run applications on any cloud infrastructure. AppScale decouples app logic from its service ecosystem to give developers and cloud administrators control over app deployment, data storage, resource use, backup and migration.

The platform allows developers to focus on the business logic of building scalable applications, freeing them from the need to concentrate on deployment and scaling logic. AppScale decouples app logic from its service ecosystem to give developers and cloud administrators control over app deployment, data storage, resource use, backup, and migration.

AppScale includes high-level APIs for persistence, asynchronous execution, distributed memory cache, user authentication, and more. It handles service discovery, load-balancing, fault-tolerance, and auto-scaling. It also allows IT operations and cloud administrators to provide a consistent, tunable environment for running and maintaining apps on multiple cloud infrastructures.
AppScale was developed and maintained by AppScale Systems, Inc., based in Santa Barbara, California, and Google.

Open source components

 Datastore API: Apache Cassandra and Apache ZooKeeper
 Memcache API: memcached
 Task Queue API: RabbitMQ and Celery
 XMPP API: ejabberd
 Channel API: ejabberd
 Blobstore API: Apache Cassandra and Apache ZooKeeper
 Images API: Python Imaging Library (PIL)
 Cron API: Crontab
 HAProxy: HAProxy

Supported platforms

 Amazon EC2
 CloudStack
 DigitalOcean
 Eucalyptus
 Google Compute Engine
 Kernel-based Virtual Machine (KVM)
 Microsoft Azure
 OpenStack
 RackSpace
 SoftLayer (IBM)
 Xen

Supported languages

 Go
 Java
 PHP
 Python

See also
Amazon Web Services
Cloud computing
Oracle Cloud
Platform as a service
 Serverless computing

External links

References 

Cloud platforms
Free software for cloud computing
Virtualization software for Linux